Up Close: Live from San Francisco is a live set of standards/cover songs recorded at the Empire Plush Room at The York Hotel in San Francisco. The concert was held for two weeks from December 4 to December 16, 2008. It was released as limited edition live album and DVD set in 2009 by singer Mary Wilson, former member of The Supremes.

Track listing
"Here's to Life" - cover of Shirley Horn song
"Smile"
"Body and Soul"
"I Believe in You and Me" - cover of The Four Tops song
"Spring Is Here" 
"Fields of Gold" - cover of Sting song
"I Remember You/The Girl from Ipanema/Mas Que Nada"
"New York State of Mind" - cover of Billy Joel song
"Don't Know Why" - cover of Norah Jones song
"My World Is Empty Without You" - cover of The Supremes song
"Tears in Heaven" - cover of Eric Clapton song
"I Am Changing" - from the Broadway play "Dreamgirls"
"Both Sides, Now" - cover of Joni Mitchell song
"What a Wonderful World" - cover of Louis Armstrong song

Personnel
Mary Wilson - vocals
Ray Parnell - guitar and vocals
Daniel Fabricant - acoustic bass
Winston Byrd - trumpet
Mark Zier - piano
Donzell Davis - drums

Production Credits
Mary Wilson - Executive Producer

References

Mary Wilson (singer) albums
2007 live albums